Woodson Ratcliffe Oglesby (February 9, 1867 – April 30, 1955) was an American lawyer and politician who served two terms as a U.S. Representative from New York from 1913 to 1917. He was a cousin of Richard James Oglesby.

Biography
Born near Shelbyville, Kentucky, Oglesby attended the public schools, Kentucky Wesleyan College (then at Millersburg), and the Illinois Wesleyan University at Bloomington. He studied law. He was admitted to the bar in 1890 and commenced practice in New York City.

Spanish-American War 
He served during the Spanish–American War as a private in Company C, Seventy-first Regiment, New York National Guard.

Political career 
He was a member of the New York State Assembly (Westchester Co., 1st D.) in 1906. He was a delegate to the 1912 Democratic National Convention.

Congress 
Oglesby was elected as a Democrat to the 63rd and 64th United States Congresses, holding office from March 4, 1913, to March 3, 1917.

Later career and death 
Afterwards he resumed the practice of law in New York City until his retirement in 1928 and resided in Yonkers, New York, and Quincy, Florida.

He died in Quincy, Florida, April 30, 1955. He was interred in Eastern Cemetery, Quitman, Georgia.

Sources

1867 births
1955 deaths
Illinois Wesleyan University alumni
Democratic Party members of the New York State Assembly
People from Yonkers, New York
Democratic Party members of the United States House of Representatives from New York (state)
People from Shelby County, Kentucky